Dry Wolf Creek is a tributary of the Judith River, approximately 40 mi (65 km) long, in central Montana in the United States.

It rises in the Lewis and Clark National Forest, near Big Baldy in the Little Belt Mountains, in western Judith Basin County. It flows northwest, past Stanford and Denton, then NNE to join the Judith in the White Cliffs Area in northern Fergus County.

See also

List of rivers of Montana
Montana Stream Access Law

Notes

Rivers of Montana
Rivers of Judith Basin County, Montana